The Boxing Tournament at the 1986 Asian Games was held in Jamsil Students' Gymnasium, Seoul, South Korea from September 25 to October 4, 1986.

The host nation South Korea dominated the competition, winning all twelve gold medals.

Medalists

Medal table

Participating nations
A total of 85 athletes from 12 nations competed in boxing at the 1986 Asian Games:

References
Amateur Boxing

External links
 OCA official website

 
1986 Asian Games events
1986
Asian Games
1986 Asian Games